Zeng Qingshen (born 11 February 1997) is a Chinese footballer who plays as a midfielder for Chinese club Hunan HBS Mangguoba.

Career

In 2018, Zeng signed for Danish top flight side Vejle. In 2019, he signed for Smederevo in the Serbian second division. In 2020, he signed for Chinese third division club Hunan Billows. On 7 November 2020, Zeng scored his first goal for Hunan Billows during a 1-2 loss to Shaoxing Keqiao Yuejia.

References

External links
 

Chinese footballers
Living people
1997 births
Expatriate men's footballers in Denmark
Association football midfielders
Expatriate footballers in Serbia